The 1980 World Rowing Championships were World Rowing Championships that were held in August 1980 at Hazewinkel in Belgium. Since 1980 was an Olympic year for rowing, the World Championships did not include the 14 Olympic classes scheduled for the 1980 Summer Olympics. Only the four lightweight men's event formed part of the competition, and all finals were raced on 16 August.

Medal summary

Medalists at the 1980 World Rowing Championships were:

Men's lightweight events

References

Rowing competitions in Belgium
World Rowing Championships
World Rowing Championships
Rowing
Rowing
World Rowing Championships